Vela 2B (also known Vela 4, Vela Hotel 4 and OPS 3674) was a U.S. reconnaissance satellite for detecting explosions and nuclear tests on land and in space, the first of the second pair of Vela series satellites, taken together with Vela 2A and ERS 13 satellites. The secondary task of the ship was space research (X-rays, gamma rays, neutrons, magnetic field and charged particles).

The satellite was rotationally stabilized (2 rps). The ship could work in real time mode (one data frame per second) or in data recording mode (one frame every 256 seconds). The first mode was used for the first 40% of the mission's duration. The second one was used until the next pair of Vela satellites were launched.

The ship remains in orbit around Earth.

Instruments
 X-ray and charged particle detector
 Gamma ray detector and charged particles
 Neutron detector
 Electron and proton spectrometer
 Background radiation detector
 Solid state detector
 Geiger-Muller counters
 Magnetometer

See also 
 Vela (satellite)

References

External links 

1964 in spaceflight
Military space program of the United States
Derelict satellites orbiting Earth